The Kansas City, Mexico and Orient Railway, started in 1900 by American railroad entrepreneur Arthur Edward Stilwell, was the predecessor of the Chihuahua al Pacífico railroad in Mexico. It was intended to reach the Pacific Ocean at Topolobampo, Sinaloa.

The United States portion was incorporated in 1900 as the Kansas City, Mexico, and Orient Railway. It was completed between Wichita, Kansas, and Alpine, Texas. Grading took place between El Dorado and Bazaar, Kansas. Primary shops were first located in Fairview, Oklahoma.  In 1910, the Fairview shops were destroyed by fire and the shops were then re-established in Wichita.  The railroad was forced into bankruptcy in 1912, but its receiver, William T. Kemper, was to make a fortune when oil was discovered under its tracks. In 1914, it was reorganized as the KCM&O Railroad. Another reorganization in 1925 returned it to its original name.  It was popularly called The Orient railroad.

The KCM&O was acquired by the Atchison, Topeka and Santa Fe Railway in 1928, mainly to gain access to the West Texas oil fields. The Santa Fe then sold the Mexican portions. The railway reached Presidio in 1930 and the Presidio–Ojinaga International Rail Bridge was built. 

Operating rights on the portion from San Angelo Junction ( NEE of San Angelo) to Presidio (known as South Orient Rail Line) later were awarded to Texas Pacifico Transportation.

See also
 Fort Worth and Rio Grande Railway - another attempt to build a railroad line to Topolobampo
 List of Mexican railroads
 List of defunct Texas railroads

References 

Defunct Kansas railroads
Defunct railway companies of Mexico
Defunct Oklahoma railroads
Defunct Texas railroads
Former Class I railroads in the United States
Predecessors of the Atchison, Topeka and Santa Fe Railway
Fort Stockton, Texas
Railway companies established in 1900
1928 disestablishments in Mexico
Railway companies disestablished in 1928
1928 mergers and acquisitions
Porfiriato
Mexican companies established in 1900